Mafeking or Mahikeng is the capital of the North West province of South Africa.

Mafeking may also refer to:
 Mafeking, Victoria, a locality near Willaura in Australia
 Mafeking, Manitoba, an unincorporated hamlet in Canada
 Mafeking, Ontario, a former hamlet in Canada
 Mafeking, Trinidad and Tobago, a village in Trinidad and Tobago

See also
 Siege of Mafeking in the Second Boer War